Juan Carlos Sáez (born 5 August 1991) is a suspended Chilean tennis player. Sáez has a career high ATP singles ranking of 230 achieved on 28 September 2015. Sáez has won 8 ITF singles events and 20 ITF doubles events on the futures circuit. Sáez made his ATP main draw doubles debut at the 2014 Royal Guard Open, partnering Gonzalo Lama losing to Daniele Bracciali and Potito Starace in the first round, 0–6, 6–3, [6–10]. In August 2019 Sáez was suspended for eight years for match-fixing.

ATP Challengers and ITF Futures finals

Singles

Doubles

References

External links

1991 births
Living people
Chilean male tennis players
Match fixers